Warren Mellie (born October 1, 1994) is a Seychellois football player. He is a defender playing for the Seychelles national football team and has represented Seychelles in the AFCON 2018. He also plays for the Northern Dynamo FC.

References 

Living people
1994 births
Seychellois footballers
Association football defenders
Seychelles international footballers